José Fágner Silva da Luz or simply Fágner, born May 25, 1988 in Agrestina-PE, is a Brazilian footballer who plays as an attacking midfielder. Fagner is a skilful and versatile forward who can play in a number of positions in attack.

In July 2011 Fagner joined South Korean K-League team Busan IPark on loan from Campeonato Brasileiro Série B side Salgueiro Atlético Clube, making a name for himself scoring twice in the league game against Suwon Samsung Bluewings on 23 July 2011. Later in the season he signed a permanent deal at Busan. In the 2013 K-League season Fagner scored ten goals in all competitions, making him IPark's joint top scorer for the season. The following year was Fagner's most prolific with the club; he scored thirteen goals in total, including ten in the league. He was named in the league's 'Best Eleven' on five occasions.

Club career statistics 
As of 30 November 2014

External links

1988 births
Living people
Brazilian footballers
Brazilian expatriate footballers
K League 1 players
Sport Club do Recife players
Salgueiro Atlético Clube players
Busan IPark players
Expatriate footballers in South Korea
Brazilian expatriate sportspeople in South Korea
Association football midfielders
Sportspeople from Pernambuco